Dripping Springs is a census-designated place in Gila County in the U.S. state of Arizona.  Dripping Springs  is located approximately 14 miles north of the town of Hayden on Arizona State Route 77.  The population as of the 2010 U.S. Census was 235.

Geography

Demographics

References

Census-designated places in Gila County, Arizona